The Polish Olympic Committee (PKOl) is the National Olympic Committee representing Poland.

History
The Polish Olympic Committee was established on 12 October 1919 and in 1919 was recognised by the International Olympic Committee.

List of presidents

Member federations
The Polish National Federations are the organizations that coordinate all aspects of their individual sports. They are responsible for training, competition and development of their sports. There are currently 29 Olympic Summer and 8 Winter Sport Federations in Poland.

See also
 Sport in Poland
 Poland at the Olympics

External links
  
 Official website

Poland
Poland at the Olympics
1918 establishments in Poland
Olympic
Sports organizations established in 1918